Louisburgh is a small town on the southwest corner of Clew Bay in County Mayo, Ireland. It is home to Sancta Maria College and the Gráinne O'Malley Interpretive Centre.

Transport

Road access
Louisburgh is located on the R335 regional road. It can be approached from Westport (13 miles) or from Leenane (19 miles).  The former approach passes along Clew Bay on one side and Croagh Patrick on the other, while the latter passes through lake and mountain scenery past Doo Lough and Delphi Lodge.

Bus services
Bus Éireann local route 450 (Louisburgh-Lecanvey-Westport-Achill) provides several daily journeys in each direction. The company's Thursday-only route to Killeen and Killadoon was discontinued in November 2020.

Rail access
The nearest rail services are from Westport railway station, approximately 24 km distant. There are several trains a day from Westport to Dublin Heuston via Athlone.

History
Most of Louisburgh lies within the townland of Clooncarrabaun (an anglicisation of Cluain Cearbán). The town was constructed in 1795 by the 3rd Earl of Altamount (later 1st Marquess of Sligo), John Denis Browne of Westport, to house Catholic refugees who fled sectarian conflict in the north of Ireland. Originally a planned town, it retains many of the eighteenth-century features in style and scale. The 1st Marquess of Sligo named the town Louisburgh in memory of his Uncle, Captain Henry Browne, who fought on the British side against the French in the battle of Louisburg in 1758. Louisburg (or Louisbourg in French) was a French fortress on Cape Breton Island, Nova Scotia, Canada. As a result of the British victory, a temporary unit of Louisbourg Grenadiers was formed, in which his Uncle was a captain.

Kilgeever Abbey is just outside the town, and consists of a ruined church, a graveyard and a holy well, where pilgrimages or patterns take place.

Geography
Louisburgh is built on the Bunowen River, part of which is a salmon fishery.  Nearby Roonagh Pier, approx 6 km from the town, is the departure point for ferries to Clare Island and Inishturk. There are a number of stunning beaches in the area renowned for their cleanliness. Nearest to the town are "majestic Old Head", Bunowen and Carramore while Carrowniskey, Cross, Lecanvey are within easy reach.  Further to the west and south are the famed beaches of White Strand of Tallabawn, Silver Strand and Uggool Beach.  Each year, on the May Bank Holiday Weekend, the town hosts a traditional music festival - Féile Chois Chuan - which attracts a large number of enthusiasts from many parts of Ireland and abroad.

The main geographical features around Louisburgh are Croagh Patrick to the east, the Sheeffry Hills and Mweelrea Mountains to the south, the Atlantic to the west and Clew Bay to the north.

Economy and culture

Louisburgh experienced an upturn in its fortunes during the economic boom in Ireland. For many years emigration and joblessness prevailed.  During the boom there was high employment especially in construction due to a large a number of holiday homes being built. Many local people commute to work in nearby towns such as Westport and Castlebar, each of which have a growing industrial base.

Louisburgh has facilities for fishermen, surfers, hill walkers, beach-walkers and photographers.

Recently the theatre has received a major boost in the town with the addition of a second drama society. The new group entitled Ceol agus Dramá i gCluain Cearbán (Music and Drama in Louisburgh) formed with a focus on children's theatre and pantomime.  They then went on to perform the first ever pantomime in Louisburgh helping to raise over 1,000 euro for the local Order of Malta group.  Since the group's inception in 2006 they have produced 6 annual pantos Dick Whittington (2006), Cinderella (2007), Aladdin (2008), Snow White (2009), "Robin Hood" (2010) and "Hansel and Gretel" (2011).

Notable people 
James Berry (1842–1914), writer.
John Heneghan SSC, Columban missionary kidnapped and killed by Japanese forces during the Second World War in the Philippines.
Mike McCormack, author
Austin O'Malley, Mayo GAA footballer.
Martin O'Toole (1925–2013), Fianna Fáil TD and senator.
Michael Viney, writer for The Irish Times.

Notes

External links

 http://www.louisburgh.com/

Towns and villages in County Mayo
1795 establishments in Ireland
Populated places established in 1795